Rouhollah Bagheri is an Iranian forward who played for Iranian football club Sepahan in the Persian Gulf Pro League.

Club career

Early years
Bagheri started his career with Mes Kerman from youth levels. As of summer 2012, he joined Etka Gorgan. He was a part of Etka Gorgan during a promotion to 2014–15 Azadegan League.

Esteghlal
On 4 June 2018, he joined Esteghlal on a two-year contract.

Club career statistics

References

1991 births
Living people
Iranian footballers
Association football forwards
Damash Gilan players
Niroye Zamini players
PAS Hamedan F.C. players
Siah Jamegan players
Sanat Mes Kerman F.C. players
Khooneh be Khooneh players
Esteghlal F.C. players
Nassaji Mazandaran players
Persian Gulf Pro League players
Azadegan League players
People from Rasht
Sportspeople from Gilan province